IDF or idf may refer to:

Defence forces
Irish Defence Forces
Israel Defense Forces
Iceland Defense Force, of the US Armed Forces, 1951-2006
Indian Defence Force, a part-time force, 1917

Organizations
Israeli Diving Federation
Interaction Design Foundation
International Diabetes Federation
International DOI Foundation, of the digital object identifier

Places
Idiofa Airport, Idiofa, Democratic Republic of the Congo (IATA airport code)
Île-de-France, region of France

Other uses
Intensity-duration-frequency curve, for rainfall
Intel Developer Forum
Intermediate Data Format, a file format for electronic design automation
Intermediate distribution frame, for telecommunications wiring
AIDC F-CK-1 Ching-kuo, Indigenous Defense Fighter, Taiwanese  aircraft
Inverse Document Frequency, a factor in the tf–idf principle
Indirect fire (see also Glossary of military abbreviations#I)

See also
 IDF1, a French TV channel